The family Neanuridae contains pudgy short-legged springtails of the order Poduromorpha. It was established by Carl Börner in 1901.

Systematics

There are six subfamilies currently recognized:
 Caputanurininae
 Frieseinae
 Morulininae
 Neanurinae
 Pseudachorutinae
 Uchidanurinae

The peculiar genus Pseudoxenylla is of uncertain relationships and hence not assigned to a subfamily yet.

Genera
These 96 genera belong to the family Neanuridae:

 Adbiloba Stach, 1951 g
 Aethiopella Handschin, 1942 i c g
 Aethiopellina Delamare, 1951 g
 Albanura Deharveng, 1982 g
 Americanura Cassagnau, 1983 g
 Anurida Laboulbene, 1865 i c g b
 Anuridella Willem, 1906 i c g
 Arlesia Handschin, 1942 g
 Australonura c g
 Balkanura Cassagnau, 1978 g
 Bilobella Caroli, 1912 g b
 Blasconura Cassagnau, 1983 g
 Blasconurella g
 Caledonimeria Delamare-Deboutteville & Massoud, 1962 g
 Caledonura Deharveng, 1988 g
 Cansilianura Dallai & Fanciulli, 1983 g
 Caputanurina Lee, 1983 g
 Cassagnaudina Massoud, 1967 g
 Catalanura Deharveng, 1982 g
 Cephalachorutes Bedos & Deharveng, 1991 g
 Ceratrimeria c g
 Chirolavia g
 Crossodonthina c g
 Cryptonura Cassagnau, 1979 g
 Delamarellina c g
 Denisimeria Massoud, 1964 g
 Deutonura Cassagnau, 1979 g
 Digitanura Deharveng, 1987 g
 Echinanura Carpenter, 1935 g
 Ectonura Cassagnau, 1980 g
 Edoughnura Deharveng, Hamra Kroua & Bedos, 2007 g
 Endonura Cassagnau, 1979 g
 Forsteramea c g
 Friesea Dalla Torre, 1895 i c g
 Furculanurida Massoud, 1967 g
 Galanura Smolis, 2000 g
 Gamachorutes Cassagnau, 1978 g
 Gastranurida Bagnall, 1949 g
 Gisinea Massoud, 1965 g
 Gnatholonche c g
 Hemilobella c g
 Holacanthella c g
 Honduranura g
 Hylaeanura Arlé, 1966 g
 Imparitubercula Stach, 1951 g
 Israelimeria Weiner & Kaprus, 2005 g
 Itanura g
 Lanzhotia Rusek, 1985 g
 Lathriopyga Caroli, 1910 g
 Lipura Burmeister, 1838 g
 Lobella (Neanura) ornata Folsom g b
 Lobellina Yosii, 1956 g
 Meganurida Carpenter, 1935 g
 Micranurida Börner, 1901 g
 Minotaurella Weiner, 1999 g
 Monobella Cassagnau, 1979 g
 Morulina Borner, 1906 i c g b
 Morulodes b
 Neanura MacGillivray, 1893 i c g b
 Neanurella Cassagnau, 1968 g
 Neotropiella Handschin, 1942 g
 Oudemansia Schött, 1893 i c g
 Paleonura c g
 Paralobella Cassagnau & Deharveng, 1984 g
 Paranura Axelson, 1902 i c g
 Parectonura Deharveng, 1988 g
 Persanura g
 Philotella Najt & Weiner, 1985 g
 Platanurida c g
 Pongeia Najt & Weiner, 2002 g
 Pratanurida Rusek, 1973 g
 Pronura Delamare-Deboutteville, 1953 g
 Protachorutes Cassagnau, 1955 g
 Protanura Borner, 1906 g
 Protodontella Christiansen & Nascimbene, 2006 g
 Pseudachorudina c g
 Pseudachorutella Stach, 1949 g
 Pseudachorutes Tullberg, 1871 i c g b
 Pseudanurida Schött, 1901 g
 Pseudoxenylla Christiansen & Pike, 2002 g
 Pumilinura Cassagnau, 1978 g
 Quatacanthella c g
 Rapoportella Ellis & Bellinger, 1973 g
 Rusekella Deharveng, 1982 g
 Sensillanura Deharveng, 1981 g b
 Siamanura Deharveng, 1987 g
 Simonachorutes g
 Stachorutes Dallai, 1973 g
 Tabasconura g
 Telobella Cassagnau, 1983 g
 Thaumanura Börner, 1932 g
 Tremoisea Cassagnau, 1973 g
 Vitronura Yosii, 1969 g b
 Yuukianura Yosii, 1955 g
 Zealandmeria c g
 Zelandanura c g

Data sources: i = ITIS, c = Catalogue of Life, g = GBIF, b = Bugguide.net

References

External links

 
Collembola
Arthropod families
Taxa named by Carl Julius Bernhard Börner